Flower of Evil is a 1915 silent Italian drama film directed by Carmine Gallone. The film was shown as part of the Silent Divas of the Italian Cinema programme at the 38th New York Film Festival in 2000.

Cast
 Ruggero Barni as Ruggero Davusky
 Lyda Borelli as Lyda
 Pina Menichelli
 Fulvia Perini as Fulvia Rogers
 Augusto Poggioli as Bambi Rogers
 Cecyl Tryan as Cecyl

References

External links
 

1915 films
1915 drama films
Italian silent feature films
Italian black-and-white films
Italian drama films
Films directed by Carmine Gallone
Silent drama films